Wahlenbergia tumidifructa is a small herbaceous plant in the family Campanulaceae. This species is native to Australia, where it has a wide distribution across subtropical, semi-arid and arid zones, occurring in all mainland states and territories.

It blooms between March and December producing blue-white flowers.

The species is found on clay pans and along drainage lines across the interior of Australia, including in the Mid West, Goldfields-Esperance, Wheatbelt and Pilbara regions of Western Australia where it grows in sandy-loamy soils.

References

tumidifructa
Eudicots of Western Australia
Plants described in 1986
Endemic flora of Western Australia